Jiang Zilei (born 10 September 1997) is a Chinese footballer currently playing as a midfielder for Nantong Zhiyun.

Club career
Jiang Zilei would play for Shanghai SIPG youth team and would be promoted to the senior team by the end of the 2017 Chinese Super League campaign before going on loan to second tier football club Wuhan Zall on 14 July 2018. He would make his senior debut in a league game on 28 October 2018 against Nei Mongol Zhongyou that ended in a 3-0 victory. In his loan period he would go on to be part of the team that gained promotion to the top tier by winning the 2018 China League One division. On 26 February 2019, Jiang would make his loan period permanent and transferred to Wuhan Zall.

On 10 March 2021, Jiang joined second tier football club Nantong Zhiyun. He would go on to make his debut in a league game on 25 April 2021 against Nanjing City in a 1-1 draw. He would go on to establish himself within the team and helped the club gain promotion to the top tier at the end of the 2022 China League One season.

Career statistics

Honours

Club
Wuhan Zall
 China League One: 2018

References

External links

1997 births
Living people
Chinese footballers
Association football midfielders
China League One players
Chinese Super League players
Shanghai Port F.C. players
Wuhan F.C. players